Pebbles, Volume 8 may refer to:

Pebbles, Volume 8 (1980 album)
Pebbles, Volume 8 (1996 album)